Bambasi Refugee Camp is refugee camp in Ethiopia.

Background 

It was established between 2011 and 2012 to host refugees mainly from the neighboring Sudan (DRC)and South Sudan. Its establishment is a partnership between the Administration for Refugee & Returnee Affairs (ARRA), International Organisation for Migration (IOM) and the Office of the United Nations High Commission for Refugees (UNHCR)

Location 
It is located in Asosa zone which is in the Benishangul-Gumuz region of north-western Ethiopia.

Demographics and population 
According to a UNHCR , 31 January 2022 camp profile, Bambasi Refugee Camp was host to 19,337 refugees and asylum seekers.

Earlier on, according to a November 2020 UNHCR camp profile, the population was 18,296, of these 9147 were male and 9149 were female. The top 3 nationalities were 18,217 (99.57%) Sudanese, 34 (0.19%) South Sudanese and 19 (0.1%) D.R Congolese

Activities 

 Education, there is education program in Bambasi Refugee camp as being one of the activities taking place with fundings from UNICEF Ethiopia.
 Health, health concern is a growing demand as health conditions become more reported in Bambasi Refugee Camp.

References 

Refugee camps in Ethiopia